The Bow Curve is a railway branch line in Bow, east London, that connects the Great Eastern Main Line (from ) and the London, Tilbury and Southend line (from ).

It was originally part of the London and Blackwall Railway and had one intermediate station called , but today, no regular timetabled services run on this line. It can, however, be used for diversions during engineering work or emergency timetable changes.

History
The line was opened by the London and Blackwall Extension Railway (LBER) on 2 April 1849 and is built on a viaduct between Gas Factory Junction on the LTSR and Bow Junction on the GEML.

When the line first opened, the only intermediate station was at Bow and Bromley, however this closed the following year. On 21 April 1941 Bow Road was closed due to bomb damage sustained during the Blitz but re-opened on 9 December 1946. It closed between 6 January and 6 October 1947 so that a number of alterations could be made. The line was electrified at this point and the original intention was to run shuttle services between Stratford and Fenchurch Street via Limehouse.

Following nationalisation of the railways in 1948, the line became part of the Eastern Region of British Rail. It was later decided to withdraw passenger services from the line and Bow Road station was permanently closed on 7 November 1949. The line remains open for diversions.

The route was reduced to a single track in  1986 to allow the Docklands Light Railway's - branch to share the alignment north of the station.

References

 
 
 

Railway lines in London
Standard gauge railways in England
Railway lines opened in 1849
Transport in the London Borough of Tower Hamlets